Falcon Field  is a football field located in Meriden, Connecticut.  It is 26.9 Acres of "premier" artificial Turf.  It was the home of the New England Nightmare of the Women's Football Alliance (WFA), which have since mid 2013 moved to Dillon Stadium  in Hartford, Connecticut.

References

External links
 Meridan Parks - Falcon Field

American football venues in Connecticut